Saint-Mard-lès-Rouffy (literally Saint-Mard near Rouffy) is a commune in the Marne department in north-eastern France.

See also
Communes of the Marne department

References

Saintmardlesrouffy